The Happy Hooker Goes Hollywood, released theatrically in the UK as Hollywood Blue, is a 1980 American comedy film directed by Alan Roberts and starring Martine Beswick, Adam West, Phil Silvers, Chris Lemmon, Edie Adams, and Richard Deacon.

Plot
The film, the last of a trilogy, is loosely based on the life of Xaviera Hollander, a prostitute from the Netherlands, as she attempts to make a film in Hollywood based on her best-selling book about her life. She gets involved with some of the most crooked producers in Hollywood, but beats them at their own game and films the movie without them.

Principal cast

See also
 The Happy Hooker (1975)
 The Happy Hooker Goes to Washington (1977)

References

External links
 

1980 films
1980s English-language films
American sex comedy films
Films about Hollywood, Los Angeles
Films about prostitution in the United States
Films set in Los Angeles
1980s sex comedy films
Golan-Globus films
Cultural depictions of Xaviera Hollander
1980 comedy films
Films produced by Menahem Golan
Films produced by Yoram Globus
1980s American films